Bonnivard is a surname. Notable people with the surname include:

 Émilie Bonnivard (born 1980), French politician
 François Bonivard (or Bonnivard) (1493–1570), French politician, nobleman, ecclesiastic, and historian

Surnames of French origin
French-language surnames